The Japanese pugnose grenadier (Nezumia condylura) is a species of rattail fish. It is found at depths of up to 720 m (2362 ft) in the waters around southern Japan, northern Taiwan and in the East China Sea.

As the common name suggests, this fish has a very short, blunt snout. It is greyish-brown overall but with a bluish tinge on the abdomen. The margins of the mouth and gills are blackish and the fins are dark. The first dorsal fin has blackish margins and has two spines.

References

Japanese pugnose grenadier
Fish of Japan
Fish of Taiwan
Marine fauna of East Asia
Japanese pugnose grenadier
Taxa named by David Starr Jordan